Italo De Zan (1 July 1925 – 9 March 2020) was an Italian racing cyclist. He won stage 10 of the 1948 Giro d'Italia. De Zan died from COVID-19 in Treviso on 9 March 2020.

Major results
Sources:
1946
 1st Coppa del Re
 4th Giro di Lombardia
1947
 1st Milano–Torino
 3rd Giro di Lombardia
 6th Giro dell'Emilia
 6th Milano-Mantova
1948
 1st Stage 10 Giro d'Italia
 2nd Milano–Torino
 2nd Coppa Placci
 3rd Giro di Romagna
 5th Milan–San Remo
1949
 1st GP Alghero
 3rd Milano–Torino
 4th Milan–San Remo

References

External links
 

1925 births
2020 deaths
Italian male cyclists
Italian Giro d'Italia stage winners
Deaths from the COVID-19 pandemic in Veneto
Cyclists from the Province of Treviso